DRV PNK Stadium (pronounced as Drive Pink Stadium, formerly Inter Miami CF Stadium) is a soccer-specific stadium in Fort Lauderdale, Florida. Built on the site of the former Lockhart Stadium, the 18,000-seat stadium is the home pitch of Inter Miami CF of Major League Soccer and its MLS Next Pro reserve side Inter Miami CF II. DRV PNK Stadium opened in 2020 as an interim venue for Inter Miami CF until the completion of the proposed Freedom Park stadium.

The stadium is the primary headquarters for the team and its youth academy, in addition to further training grounds.

History
The Fort Lauderdale Strikers announced in 2016 that they were moving out of Lockhart Stadium, after which the stadium fell into a state of disrepair. In January 2019, Major League Soccer expansion team Inter Miami CF announced its intentions to pursue the Lockhart Stadium site to serve as the club's training ground for its first team, youth academy, and future USL League One (USL1) team Fort Lauderdale CF. The Fort Lauderdale city council unanimously approved Inter Miami's bid for the Lockhart Stadium site in March 2019. In April, the Fort Lauderdale City Commission cleared Inter Miami to begin the demolition process.

On July 9, 2019, the Fort Lauderdale City Commission unanimously approved a 50-year lease agreement for the Lockhart Stadium site with Inter Miami; under the terms of the agreement, the city of Fort Lauderdale will retain ownership of the property while Inter Miami will be responsible for the construction, operation, and maintenance of the new facilities. The stadium is intended to be an interim facility for Inter Miami CF until the completion of the proposed Freedom Park stadium in downtown Miami; the expansion franchise was granted on the condition that a stadium eventually be built in downtown Miami.

On November 13, 2019, Inter Miami CF announced that the club's inaugural home match would be scheduled for March 14, 2020, against the LA Galaxy. Due to the COVID-19 pandemic, the MLS season was paused. Fort Lauderdale CF therefore played the first match of the new stadium, a 0–2 loss to Greenville Triumph SC. Inter Miami CF would not play home matches until August 22, 2020, when they beat their in-state rival Orlando City SC 3–2 in the first MLS match at the stadium.

On April 8, 2021, it was reported that Inter Miami CF had reached a naming rights agreement with AutoNation; the agreement was officially announced the next day. The stadium is branded as DRV PNK Stadium, a tie-in with AutoNation's breast cancer awareness campaign.

Soccer
On December 9, 2020, the stadium hosted its first international match between the United States and El Salvador; the United States won 6–0. During the 2021 MLS season, CF Montréal used the stadium to play their home matches since the start of the season after travel restrictions prevented the team from playing their matches in Montreal.

Notable matches

American football
DRV PNK Stadium has also hosted American football games, including the Miami Hurricanes spring game, and the Florida High School Athletic Association state championships.

Transportation

DRV PNK Stadium is located near Interstate 95 at its junction with Commercial Boulevard (State Route 870) in Fort Lauderdale. The stadium has three designated parking lots for pre-purchased ticketholders and an additional lot for other visitors. The nearest Tri-Rail commuter rail station is Cypress Creek, but additional nighttime train service is not provided for Inter Miami CF matches.

In April 2022, Inter Miami CF announced a partnership with Brightline to provide passenger trains from Miami and West Palm Beach to Fort Lauderdale station with a dedicated shuttle for fans. The service, named the GOOOL Getter, will have three round-trips before and after home matches.

References

External links
 

2020 establishments in Florida
Buildings and structures in Fort Lauderdale, Florida
Major League Soccer stadiums
Soccer venues in Florida
Sports in Fort Lauderdale, Florida
Sports venues in Broward County, Florida
Tourist attractions in Fort Lauderdale, Florida
Sports venues completed in 2020
American football venues in Florida